"Tiring Game" is a song by English singer John Newman. It features the vocals from American singer Charlie Wilson. The song was released on 26 August 2015 as the second single from his second studio album, Revolve (2015). This song also included as soundtrack in EA Sports game, FIFA 16.

Music video
A music video to accompany the release of "Tiring Game" was first released onto YouTube on 26 August 2015 at a total length of three minutes and forty-three seconds.

Track listing

Charts

Release history

References

2015 singles
2015 songs
Charlie Wilson (singer) songs
John Newman (singer) songs
Island Records singles
Songs written by Charlie Wilson (singer)
Songs written by John Newman (singer)